Calcio Padova, commonly referred to as Padova, is an Italian football club based in Padua, Veneto. The team's official colours are white and red.

The team was refounded in 2014 after the sports title was awarded to Biancoscudati Padova for the 2014–15 Serie D season as a phoenix club. The old holder of the title was in the process of liquidation after it was expelled from 2014–15 Lega Pro. The original Padova was renamed Football Padova in order to allow the new iteration of Padova to use the original name of the club, Calcio Padova in 2015.

History
In the 1940s, the team was coached by Béla Guttmann. Padova's golden days were the late 1950s, when the team managed by Nereo Rocco, reached the heights of third place in 1958 thanks to the wing wizardry of Kurt Hamrin. Forwards Sergio Brighenti and Aurelio Milani would star as Padova remained a force in Serie A, before relegation in 1962. The rest of the 1960s would see the club in Serie B before going into a serious decline ahead of a 1980s revival.

The revival would see Padova return to Serie B in the early 1980s, and within a decade they would be serious promotion contenders. A play-off win over Cesena in 1994 saw the club return to Serie A after 32 years. After a dire start to the 1994–95 season, Padova looked like fulfilling most experts' predictions of a swift return to Serie B. They nonetheless found their form in the second half of the year and when they recorded a 1–0 win away to Juventus, they were six points clear of the drop zone. However, they eventually ended up contesting the relegation play-off against Genoa, due to a late Inter Milan goal assisted by a Rubén Sosa corner, which they won on penalties.

There would be no such luck the following year, as Padova were relegated, with further relegations in 1998 and 1999. Since 2001, they have resided in Serie C1 and Lega Pro Prima Divisione. The team returned in Serie B at the end of the 2008–2009 season.

In total, Calcio Padova participated in 11 Prima Divisione/Divisione Nazionale championships between 1914–15 and 1928–29 (best place being 3rd in 1922–23) and 16 Serie A championships between 1929–30 and 1995–96 (best place being 3rd in 1957–58); in Coppa Italia, the best place was runner-up in 1967. Padova won a Coppa Italia Serie C in 1980, and played also 34 Serie B championships (won in 1947–48) and 29 Serie C1/C2/Lega Pro Prima Divisione championships (won in 1936–37, 1980–81 and 2000–01). Padova finished runner-up the Anglo-Italian Cup of 1983.

In the 2013–14 Serie B season, Padova were relegated after finishing 20th, and on 15 July 2014, the team did not sign up to the 2014–15 Lega Pro championship. In April 2015, the company was put into liquidation.

Biancoscudati Padova

The club was founded in the summer of 2014, with the name Società Sportiva Dilettantistica a r.l. Biancoscudati Padova, after the non-inclusion of Calcio Padova in Lega Pro and Serie D.

The first official match was Biancoscudati Padova-Castellana (2–0), valid for the Coppa Italia Serie D, played 24 August 2014.

On 19 April 2015, by virtue of a 2–1 away victory against Legnago, the team secured promotion to Lega Pro.

On 5 June 2015, changed its name to Biancoscudati Padova Spa.

On 6 July 2015, changed its name to Calcio Padova Spa, after the old Calcio Padova changed its name to Football Padova Spa – società in liquidazione.

Players

First team squad

.

Other players under contract

Out on loan

Honours
Serie B
Winners: 1947–48 (group B)
Serie C
Winners: 1936–37 (group C), 2017–18 (group B)
Serie C2
Winners: 1980–81 (group B), 2000–01 (group A)
Serie D
Winners: 2014–15 (group C)
Coppa Italia Serie C
Winners: 1979–80, 2021–22
Supercoppa di Serie C
Winners: 2018

Divisional movements

References

External links

 
Football clubs in Italy
Football clubs in Veneto
Sport in Padua
Association football clubs established in 1910
Italian football First Division clubs
Serie C clubs
Serie D clubs
Serie A clubs
Serie B clubs
1910 establishments in Italy
Coppa Italia Serie C winning clubs
2014 establishments in Italy
Phoenix clubs (association football)